The 2022 Trans–Tasman Hockey Series was a women's field hockey series, comprising four test matches between the national teams of Australia and New Zealand. The series was held at the National Hockey Centre in Auckland, from 10 to 15 May.

Due to the ongoing impacts of the COVID-19 pandemic, the series was the first time the two teams played an international match since August 2021, in their respective matches at Olympic Games. The series was scheduled to be held alongside the men's event, however this was postponed due to COVID related issues.

Squads

Head coach: Katrina Powell

Head coach: Darren Smith

Results
All times are local (NZST).

Standings

Fixtures

Goalscorers

References

External links
Hockey New Zealand
Hockey Australia

International women's field hockey competitions hosted by New Zealand
Trans-Tasman Series
Trans-Tasman Series
Trans-Tasman Series
Sport in Auckland
Trans-Tasman Hockey Series